Ge Wei (born September 9, 1989 in Nanjing) is a Chinese football player who currently plays as a striker for Taizhou Yuanda in the China League One.

Club career
Ge was promoted to Jiangsu Sainty's first team squad in 2008 but didn't have a chance to appear in the senior team until he made his debut in a league game on 26 May 2010 in a 1-0 home win over Tianjin Teda. He would soon score his first senior league goal on his fourth appearance when he scored in 77th minute to ensure Jiangsu beat Nanchang Hengyuan 1-0 at home win on 24 July. On 24 September, he suffered a cruciate ligament damage in his right knee in a league match which Jiangsu Sainty played against Hangzhou Greentown, ruling him out for the rest of the season. He was sent to the reserve team in 2018.

On 24 January 2019, Ge transferred to League Two newcomer Taizhou Yuanda.

Career statistics 
Statistics accurate as of match played 28 November 2020.

Honours

Club
Jiangxi Liansheng
China League Two: 2014
Jiangsu Sainty
Chinese FA Cup: 2015

References

External links
Player stats at Sohu.com

1989 births
Living people
Sportspeople from Nanjing
Chinese footballers
Footballers from Jiangsu
Jiangsu F.C. players
Jiangxi Beidamen F.C. players
Taizhou Yuanda F.C. players
Chinese Super League players
China League One players
China League Two players

Association football forwards